The Department of the Director of Naval Equipment  also known as the Directorate of Naval Equipment was the former British Admiralty department responsible for managing the progress of all naval construction at royal naval dockyards, and annually planning programmes of works for additions, alterations, repairs and modernisation established in 1912 until 1960 when it was replaced by the Naval Equipment Division of the Ship Department.

History
The department was originally established on 3 September 1912, the department was primarily concerned with overseeing the progress of all naval construction at royal naval dockyards, In addition it planned and monitored programmes of works for additions, alterations, repairs and modernisation of all ships. The department worked in partnership with the Department of the Director of Dockyards, both of these departments were overseen by the office of the Third Sea Lord from 1912 to 1939.Between 1939 and 1956 the department was assigned a number of times between the Department of the Vice-Controller of Navy who was then co-styled Vice-Controller of the Navy and Director of Naval Equipment and the Department of the Vice-Controller (Air) who was then co-styled Vice-Controller of the Navy and Director of Naval Equipment In 1960 it ceased being a distinct admiralty department when it was downgraded and replaced by the Naval Equipment Division of the new Ship Department that was headed by a Director-General, Ships.

Directors of Naval Equipment
Included:
 Rear-Admiral Arthur W. Waymouth, 3 September 1912 – January, 1915 
 Captain Clement Greatorex, 14 January 1915 – 8 October 1917 
 Rear-Admiral Edward M. Phillpotts, 8 October 1917 – 1 May 1920 
 Rear-Admiral Edward F. Bruen, 1 May 1920 – 16 May 1922
 Rear-Admiral Douglas L. Dent, 2 May 1922  
 Rear-Admiral Arthur A. M. Duff, 16 May 1924  
 Rear-Admiral Henry W. Parker, 17 May 1926 – 17 May 1928
 Rear-Admiral Joseph C. W. Henley, 15 May 1928 – 14 March 1930
 Rear-Admiral Harold O. Reinold, 14 March 1930 – 2 March 1931
 Rear-Admiral Percy L. H. Noble, – 30 November 1932
 Rear-Admiral Cecil Ponsonby Talbot, 30 November 1932 – 10 December 1934
 Rear-Admiral St. Aubyn B. Wake, 10 December 1934 – 10 December 1936
 Rear-Admiral Francis Thomas B. Tower, 10 December 1936 – July 1944 and (Vice-Controller of the Navy from 1939)
 Vice-Admiral Sir Henry C. Phillips: July 1944-June 1947 and (Vice-Controller of the Navy) 
 Rear-Admiral Matthew S. Slattery: May 1945-January 1948 (Vice-Controller Air)) 
 Rear-Admiral Geoffrey A.B. Hawkins: June 1947-October 1949 and (Vice-Controller of the Navy) 
 Rear-Admiral Lachlan D. Mackintosh: January 1948-February 1950 (Vice- Controller (Air)) 
 Rear-Admiral C.Aubrey L. Mansergh: October 1949-June 1950 and (Vice-Controller of the Navy) 
 Rear-Admiral E.M. Conolly Abel Smith: February 1950 – 1953 (Vice-Controller (Air))
 Rear-Admiral JJohn Hughes-Hallett: June 1950-June 1952 and (Vice-Controller of the Navy) 
 Rear-Admiral Gerald V. Gladstone: June 1952-October 1953 and (Vice-Controller of the Navy) 
 Rear-Admiral Guy B. Sayer: October 1953-April 1956 and (Vice-Controller of the Navy)
 Rear-Admiral Nicholas A. Copeman: April 1956-April 1957 
 Captain Maurice L. Hardie: April 1957-February 1959 
 Captain John P. Scatchard: February 1959-September 1960

Assistant Directors of Naval Equipment
Included:
 Captain Henry R. Crooke, 18 February 1913 – 1914
 Captain Ernest K. Loring, 1 October 1914 – 3 April 1915
 Captain Henry L. Cochrane, 3 April 1915 
 Captain (retired) Christopher P. Metcalfe, late 1916 (for salvage work, working with Henry Lake Cochrane)
 Captain Hugh T. Walwyn, 1 March 1917 – January, 1918
 Captain Alan G. Hotham, 1917 – 1 October 1917
 Captain Percy Withers, 10 January 1918 – 7 May 1919
 Captain Arthur T. Walker, 30 May 1925 – 1 October 1926
 Captain Patrick E. Parker, 23 March 1928 – 2 April 1930
 Captain Harold G. C. Franklin, 2 April 1930 – 4 April 1932
 Captain Stuart S. Bonham-Carter, 14 March 1932 – 14 March 1936
 Captain Martin J. C. de Meric, 1 December 1938 – 18 September 1939

Deputy Director of Naval Equipment
Included:
 Captain Hugh A.C. Dick: February 1940-December 1943
 Captain Hon. Oswald W. Cornwallis: December 1943-January 1945
 Captain Gerald O.C. Davies: January 1945-August 1946
 Captain William P. McCarthy: August 1946-August 1948
 Captain S. Brian De Courcy Ireland: August 1948-March 1951
 Captain Charles W. Greening: March 1951-August 1952
 Captain Howard F. Bone: August 1952-July 1954
 Captain Richard L.S. Gaisford: July 1954-August 1955
 Captain William W. Stewart-Fitzroy: December 1954 – 1956
 Captain Richard L.H. Marsh: August 1955 – 1957
 Captain Thomas N. Catlow: 1958-July 1959
 Captain Ian S. McIntosh: July 1959 – 1960 (transferred to Naval Equipment Division (Ship Department) until July 1961)

Department structure

Salvage Section
Head of Salvage Section
 Commander J. H. Dathan, 1915 -1916 
 Captain Christopher P. Metcalfe, 1916 - 1917
 Hon. Captain Frederic W. Young, 1917-1920 
 Commodore, Hon. Sir Frederic W. Young, 1921-1927
Salvage Accounts section
Note: The Salvage Section was replaced by a new Salvage Department in 1939.

Office of the Captain/Admiral superintendent ships building by contract
For Contract Work (not including Destroyers) on the Clyde
 Captain Edward Stafford Fitzherbert, 1912 - 1913
 Captain Brian H. F. Barttelot, 1913 - 1917
 Rear-Admiral John F. E. Green, 1917 - 1918
 Captain Cecil H. Fox, 1918 - 1920
 Captain Herbert, Buchanan-Woolaston, 1 January 1924 - 1926
 Captain Ambrose Thomas Norman Abbay, 1926 -1928
 Commander L. B. Hill, 30 September 1938 - 1939

Contract Work (not including Destroyers) on the Tyne, Thames, Mersey, at Barrow-in-Furness, and at Sunderland
 Captain Laurence E. Power, 1913 - 1917
 Rear-Admiral Alfred E. A. Grant, 1917 - 1918
 Captain William F. Slayter, 1918 -1920

Office of the Captain/Admiral superintendent destroyers building by contract
Included:
 Captain Douglas L. Dent, 1912 - 1913
 Captain Cyril Asser, 1913 - 1917
 Rear-Admiral Laurence E. Power, 1917 - 1918
 Captain Frank F. Rose, 1918 -1920
 Commander L. B. Hill, 1933 -1937
 Vice-Admiral, St, A. B. Wake, Retd, 1937-1939

References

Sources
 Mackie, Colin, (2010-2014), British Armed Services between 1860 and the present day — Royal Navy - Senior Appointments, http://www.gulabin.com/.
 Harley Simon, Lovell Tony, (2017), Department of the Director of Naval Equipment, http://www.dreadnoughtproject.org.
 Rodger, N.A.M. (1979). The Admiralty. Offices of State. Lavenham: T. Dalton. .

Attribution
 The primary source for this article is by Harley Simon, Lovell Tony, (2017), http://www.dreadnoughtproject.org/Department of the Director of Naval Equipment

External links

Admiralty departments
Admiralty during World War II
Royal Navy
1912 establishments in the United Kingdom
1939 disestablishments in the United Kingdom